The fourth series of British talent competition programme Britain's Got Talent was broadcast on ITV, from 17 April to 5 June 2010; due to live coverage of the 2010 UEFA Champions League Final on 22 May, the sixth audition episode of the series was pushed back a day to avoid clashing with it. Production on the fourth series during the filmed auditions required Louis Walsh to step in as a guest judge, after Simon Cowell became ill and unable to partake in certain sessions.

The fourth series was won by gymnastic troupe Spelbound and finishing in first place and dance duo Twist and Pulse finishing in second place. During its broadcast, the series averaged around 11 million viewers. Episodes of the live rounds were the first in the programme's history to feature guest performers within live result episodes, and were also the first to be broadcast in high definition; both the audition episodes and its sister show, Britain's Got More Talent, remained in standard definition until the following year.

Series overview

Following open auditions held the previous year, the Judges' auditions took place across January and February 2010, within Manchester, Glasgow, Birmingham, London and Cardiff. They also took place within Newcastle upon Tyne, after they were cancelled at the last minute during production of the previous series. The Birmingham auditions were most notable in this series, due to the fact that because Cowell fell ill before he could attend them, marking the first time in the show's history he was unable to attend auditions, Louis Walsh replaced him as a guest judge for these until he had recovered. One significant change made to the programme in this series was towards the scheduling of semi-finals. Both the production staff and the broadcaster decided for the live semi-finals to follow a similar format incorporated in the live final - each set of semi-final performances were held in one episode, followed by a break to allow ITV to air another programme or a news programme, so as to give time for the public vote to be counted. The results would then be aired after this break, in a live results episode, much like the live finals had done in the past three series.

Of the participants that took part, only forty made it past this stage and into the five live semi-finals, with eight appearing in each one, and ten of these acts making it into the live final. The following below lists the results of each participant's overall performance in this series:

 |  |  | 

  Ages denoted for a participant(s), pertain to their final performance for this series.
  No precise locations were disclosed for The Chippendoubles - both as a group or for each respective member - during their time on the programme.
  The latter value is the age of the dog, as disclosed by its owner.

Semi-final summary
 Buzzed out |  Judges' vote | 
 |  |

Semi-final 1 (31 May)
Guest Performers, Results Show: Diversity

Semi-final 2 (1 June)
Guest Performer, Results Show: Alicia Keys

Semi-final 3 (2 June)
Guest Performer, Results Show: Pixie Lott

Semi-final 4 (3 June)
Guest Performer, Results Show: Miley Cyrus

Semi-final 5 (4 June)
Guest Performers, Results Show: JLS

Final (5 June)
Guest Performers, Results Show: Usher, Dizzee Rascal, and James Corden

 |

Ratings

References

2010 British television seasons
Britain's Got Talent